Chhollywood refers to the film industry of Chhattisgarh state, central India, or to films created in the Chhattisgarhi language.  It was established in 1965 with the release of the first Chhattisgarhi-language film, Kahi Debe Sandesh.

History 
Kahi Debe Sandesh (transl. Convey The Message) was released in 1965. Directed and produced by Manu Nayak, it was a story of intercaste love; its release caused controversy, with Brahmins calling for a ban.  The next Chhattisgarhi film to be released was Ghar Dwar in 1971, produced by Vijay Kumar Pandey. However, both performed poorly at the box office.

On October 27, 2000, Mor Chhainha Bhuinya was released, the first Chhattisgarhi film since Ghar Dwar. The film was a major success, grossing ₹20,000,000, recouping its budget of ₹2,000,000 - ₹3,000,000. 

Interest in the genre would further increase in 2005 when Bhakla was released, featuring a song composed by Kalyan Sen and sung by Lata Mangeshkar. Later, the film Bar. Satish Jain, having watched the film produced Mayaa, Films such as Mahun Deewana Tahun Deewani (Swapnil Film Productions)  Tura Rikshawala, and Laila Tip Top Chhaila Angutha Chhap were released soon after.  

Bhulan The Maze opened to international praise and won several awards. It become first Chhattisgarhi movie to win a National Film Awards, winning in category of Best Film in Chhattisgarhi at 67th National Film Awards.

Today Chhattisgarhi films often play in theatres outside of Chhattisgarh, especially in cities like Nagpur.

References 

 Cinema of India by state or union territory
 Culture of Chhattisgarh